Roy Burns (6 October 1916 – 20 November 1983) was an English footballer who played in the Football League for Port Vale.

Career
Burns began his professional career with Wolverhampton Wanderers but never made a first team appearance for the club before joining Port Vale in October 1935. He failed to nail down a regular place and played just two Second Division games, defeats to Leicester City at Filbert Street and Swansea Town at The Old Recreation Ground in November 1935, before having his contract cancelled in January 1936. He moved to Bournemouth to play for Bournemouth Trams, Bournemouth & Boscombe Athletic and once more with Bournemouth Trams.

Career statistics
Source:

References

1916 births
1983 deaths
AFC Bournemouth players
Association football wingers
English Football League players
English footballers
Footballers from Wolverhampton
Port Vale F.C. players
Wolverhampton Wanderers F.C. players